Nil Diya Yahana is a 2008 Sri Lankan Sinhala drama film directed by Dayaratne Ratagedara and co-produced by Mali Hettiarachchi and Sujeewa Priyashantha for Hemlock Investments. It stars Saranga Disasekara in debut cinema acting with Chathurika Pieris in lead roles along with Tony Ranasinghe and Chandani Seneviratne. Music composed by Rohana Weerasinghe. It is the 1117th Sri Lankan film in the Sinhala cinema.

Shooting of the film was completed in and around Colombo, Dambulla and Nuwara Eliya. Dileepa Jayakody marked his entrance as the script writer.

Plot

Cast
 Saranga Disasekara as Shanuka Mayadunne
 Chathurika Peiris as Shehara Jayawardena 
 Tony Ranasinghe as Jayawardena, Shehara's father
 Chandani Seneviratne as Asha, Shehara's mother
 Sanath Gunathilake as Minister
 Wilson Karunaratne
 Damayanthi Fonseka as Shanuka's elder sister
 Roshan Pilapitiya
 Manike Attanayake as Shanuka's mother
 Daya Alwis
 Dilan Perera as Tuition techer
 Manjula Moragaha as Danushka
 Dasun Pathirana

Soundtrack

References

2008 films
2000s Sinhala-language films
2008 drama films
Sri Lankan drama films